Saint Michael's Church is a parish of the Roman Catholic Diocese of Rockford. The church is located in Galena, Illinois, United States, at 227 South Bench Street in Galena.

The parish is named after the Archangel Michael, and is seated on a hill overlooking downtown Galena.

History

The parish traces its history back to August 22, 1832, when it was founded by the pioneer priest, Father Samuel Charles Mazzuchelli, who served as pastor of the parish from 1835 to 1843, and during this time directed the building of a church. This parish served until it was destroyed by a fire which had consumed a good portion of downtown Galena.

Father Mazzuchelli began working with St. Michael's parish to build a new building to replace the one lost in the fire. This new building had a truss formation to hold the weight of the roof, which helped eliminate the need for pillars within the church.  This building still stands today, and continues to serve as a place of worship.

See also
 Saint Michael: Roman Catholic traditions and views

External links
 Saint Michael's official website

Churches in Jo Daviess County, Illinois
Buildings and structures in Galena, Illinois
Roman Catholic churches completed in 1832
19th-century Roman Catholic church buildings in the United States
Churches in the Roman Catholic Diocese of Rockford
1832 establishments in Illinois